The 1986–87 Kentucky Wildcats men's basketball team represented University of Kentucky in the 1986–87 NCAA Division I men's basketball season. The head coach was Eddie Sutton and the team finished the season with an overall record of 18–11.

Schedule

Roster

Season summary
Feb. 11 vs. Tennessee: Kentucky rallied from 10 down with 1:13 left in the game. Rex Chapman hit a running 12-footer over Tennessee's Doug Roth with three seconds left to force overtime, where the Wildcats eventually won.

Rankings

Awards
Rex Chapman
1st Team All-SEC (Coaches)
2nd Team All-SEC (AP, UPI)
Freshman All-SEC

Ed Davender
2nd Team All-SEC (UPI)
3rd Team All-SEC (AP)

References 

Kentucky Wildcats men's basketball seasons
Kentucky
Kentucky
Kentucky Wildcats
Kentucky Wildcats